Park Shin-zi (Hangul: 박신지; born July 16, 1999) is South Korean professional baseball pitcher who is currently playing for the Doosan Bears of the KBO League. He graduated from Kyunggi High School and was selected by the Bears in a 2018 draft (2nd draft, 1st round).

References

External links 

 Career statistics and player information from the KBO League
 Park Shin-ji at Doosan Bears Baseball Club

1999 births
Living people
People from Gimpo
KBO League players
KBO League pitchers
Doosan Bears players